Techno India Group is a private educational conglomerate group in India. The main office of this group is situated in Salt Lake City in Kolkata, West Bengal.

Techno India Group Universities

Techno India Group Engineering Colleges

Gallery

References

External links

Business schools in Kolkata